NALT may refer to:

 National Agricultural Library Thesaurus (NALT). NALT is used by organizations as a key component for organizing and describing agricultural information.
 Northwest Achievement Levels Test
 Nasal-associated lymphoid tissue